Ruffiac is a commune in the Lot-et-Garonne department in south-western France.

History

The population of Volgelsheim (Haut-Rhin) was moved to the town and the neighboring Antagnac September 1939 to June 1940, a width of 10 km from the Rhine area were evacuated to make room for French armies. There is a street named Volgelsheim Street in Ruffiac.

In January 1973, Ruffiac was merged with the neighbor Antagnac. In March 2001, the two communes were separated again.

Demography
In 2017, the town had 173 inhabitants.

See also
Communes of the Lot-et-Garonne department

References

Communes of Lot-et-Garonne